Battery Park is a public park overlooking Lake Champlain at the western end of downtown Burlington, Vermont. The park includes a bandshell, a playground, and various monuments, including a bronze statue of Civil War veteran General William W. Wells, and a red oak sculpture of Chief Gray Lock, a veteran of Gray Lock's War. Locally, it is popular for its wide, sweeping views of Lake Champlain.

History 

The park was named for the artillery stationed there by American forces during the War of 1812.

The park land was deeded to the City of Burlington in 1870, and the Battery Park Extension was added to the southern end in 1972.

Trivia 
 Because of its unobstructed view high above Burlingon's harbor, Battery Park is a very popular spot for observers of the Independence Day fireworks launched from a barge in the bay.
 According to noted author Rudyard Kipling (The Jungle Book), Battery Park has one of the two finest sunset views in the world, with the other location being Kenya’s Ngong Hills.

References

Links 
 Vermont Department of Parks and Recreation
 President Lyndon B. Johnson's Remarks at Battery Park
 Battle at Burlington (1813)

Parks in Vermont
Geography of Burlington, Vermont
Protected areas of Chittenden County, Vermont
Tourist attractions in Burlington, Vermont